Taking Care of Business (released in the United Kingdom as Filofax) is a 1990 American comedy film directed by Arthur Hiller and starring James Belushi and Charles Grodin. It is named after the song of the same name by Randy Bachman, recorded by the Canadian rock group Bachman–Turner Overdrive (BTO). The film is also known for being the first screenplay work written by J. J. Abrams, who later went on to make several blockbuster films, including Super 8 and Star Wars: The Force Awakens.

Plot
A convicted car thief and diehard Chicago Cubs fan, Jimmy Dworski (Belushi) wins tickets to the World Series. Unfortunately, he still has a couple of days left to serve in prison and the warden, Frank Toolman (Héctor Elizondo), will not let him leave and come back. With the help of other inmates, Jimmy stages a riot so he can sneak out of prison to see the game. On the way, he finds the Filofax of uptight and spineless advertising executive Spencer Barnes (Grodin), which promises a reward if it is found.

Over the next day, Jimmy takes on Barnes' identity—staying in the Malibu beach house of Spencer's boss, flirting with the boss's daughter, even taking a meeting with a powerful Japanese food company magnate named Sakamoto (Mako Iwamatsu). The fake "Spencer"'s unorthodox methods, such as beating the magnate at tennis and telling him about the poor quality of his food products, gets the attention of the taken aback Sakamoto. However his unconventional negotiations with the food company insult some of the executives, seemingly ruining Spencer's reputation.

Meanwhile, lacking his precious Filofax, the real Spencer Barnes is spiraling into the gutter. Losing all his clothes, his car and money, he has to rely on an old high school flame, the neurotic and overbearing Debbie Lipton (Anne De Salvo) who keeps trying to rekindle a relationship with him.

Finally Jimmy and Spencer come together at a meeting with the advertising executives, where Spencer's boss finally pushes him over the edge for Jimmy's work, and Spencer quits. As a consolation Jimmy takes Spencer to the World Series, where Jimmy makes a spectacular catch on a home-run ball hit by Mark Grace, who makes a cameo.

When security goes after Jimmy, who was spotted on the Jumbotron, they escape by using Spencer's Filofax to slide down a support wire and out of the stadium. Spencer patches up his marriage with his wife, who had become exasperated with his overworking. Jimmy sneaks back into prison with Spencer's help, serves his last couple of hours and is released, only to find Spencer waiting to pick him up. With the promise of a beautiful girlfriend and a well-paying job in advertising work with Spencer, Jimmy's future looks bright, as does that of his beloved Cubs, who won the World Series.

Cast
 James Belushi as Jimmy Dworski / Spencer Barnes
 Charles Grodin as Spencer Barnes
 Mako as Mr. Sakamoto
 Héctor Elizondo as Warden Frank Toolman
 Veronica Hamel as Elizabeth Barnes
 Stephen Elliott as Walter Bentley
 Loryn Locklin as Jewel Bentley
 John de Lancie as Ted Bradford Jr.
 Gates McFadden as Diane Connors
 Anne De Salvo as Debbie Lipton
 Andre Rosey Brown as "Heavy G"
 Burke Byrnes as Prison Guard

Reception
The film received negative reviews, with Caryn James of The New York Times labeling it as a film that "plays it safe and boring."

The review aggregator website Rotten Tomatoes reported that 33% of critics have given the film a positive review based on 15 reviews, with an average rating of 3.1/10.

Production
Baseball scenes for Taking Care of Business were filmed at Angel Stadium of Anaheim in California.

The film grossed $20 million in the United States.

See also
 List of American films of 1990

References

External links
 
 
 

1990 films
1990s screwball comedy films
1990s sports films
Hollywood Pictures films
American baseball films
Films directed by Arthur Hiller
American screwball comedy films
1990s English-language films
Films scored by Stewart Copeland
Films with screenplays by J. J. Abrams
1990 comedy films
Chicago Cubs
1990s American films